Kátia Regina de Jesús Santos (born 31 December 1967 in Salvador, Bahia) is a former Brazilian athlete who specialised in the sprinting events. She represented her country in the 4 × 100 metres relay at the 2004 Summer Olympics narrowly missing the final.

She has personal bests of 11.42 seconds in the 100 metres (2000) and 23.33 seconds in the 200 metres (2002).

Competition record

References

1967 births
Living people
Sportspeople from Salvador, Bahia
Brazilian female sprinters
Athletes (track and field) at the 2004 Summer Olympics
Olympic athletes of Brazil
Athletes (track and field) at the 1995 Pan American Games
South American Games silver medalists for Brazil
South American Games bronze medalists for Brazil
South American Games medalists in athletics
Competitors at the 1994 South American Games
Pan American Games athletes for Brazil
Olympic female sprinters
21st-century Brazilian women
20th-century Brazilian women